The Doug Engelbart Institute, previously known as The Bootstrap Alliance, is a collaborative organization founded in 1988 by the late Douglas Engelbart and his daughter Christina Engelbart, to research into the enhancement of human ability to solve complex, urgent problems. Engelbart believed that it is possible to enhance society's collective intelligence by applying his strategies.

See also
Engelbart's law

References

External links 
Official Website

Independent research institutes
Non-profit technology
Research institutes established in 1988